Briean Boddy-Calhoun (born January 21, 1993) is an American football cornerback who is a free agent. He played college football at Minnesota, and was originally signed by the Jacksonville Jaguars as an undrafted free agent in 2016. He has also played for the Cleveland Browns, Houston Texans, Indianapolis Colts, and San Francisco 49ers.

Early years
Boddy-Calhoun attended Delcastle Technical High School, where he played high school football. He was named first-team all-conference and third-team all-state as a defensive back following his junior season. As a senior, he earned first-team all-state defensive back and second-team all-state kick returner honors. He was a three-time honorable mention all-conference selection as a quarterback. In addition to football, he was a standout in track & field and basketball. He earned all-state honors as a high jumper and was a two-time all-conference selection as a point guard in basketball.

College career

Coffeyville Community College
After graduating high school, Boddy-Calhoun attended and played football for Coffeyville Community College. He was named second-team All-Jayhawk Conference as a cornerback after his only season as a member of the Red Ravens. He earned Jayhawk Conference Defensive Player of the Week honors twice and Special Teams Player of the Week once. He tallied 40 tackles, four interceptions, three fumble recoveries, and a blocked kick in his time with Coffeyville Community College.

University of Minnesota
Boddy-Calhoun transferred to the University of Minnesota after one season at Coffeyville Community College. He played in all 13 games as a reserve and made nine tackles. He made Minnesota debut at UNLV, but did not record any statistics. He had a career-high four tackles against Texas Tech.

Boddy-Calhoun suffered a season-ending knee injury in the second game of his junior season on September 7 at New Mexico State. He received a medical redshirt from the NCAA. He did contribute to the season early on. He made three tackles and returned an interception against UNLV. He made two tackles at New Mexico State before being injured.

Boddy-Calhoun played in 13 games and started 10 in his redshirt junior season. He finished the year with 51 tackles, including 2.0 tackles-for-loss and recorded five interceptions. He broke up nine passes and forced two fumbles and recovered one fumble. He was named All-Big Ten First-team by the media and All-Big Ten Second-team by conference coaches.

Boddy-Calhoun played in 11 games and started nine games in his final season with Minnesota. He made 48 tackles, including 1.5 tackles-for-loss and paced the team with four interceptions and returned one for a touchdown. He broke up six passes and recovered a fumble. He was named All-Big Ten Third-team by the media and was an honorable mention selection by the conference coaches in recognition of his successful season.

Professional career

Jacksonville Jaguars
After going undrafted in the 2016 NFL Draft, Boddy-Calhoun signed with the Jacksonville Jaguars on May 1, 2016. On September 3, 2016, he was waived by the Jaguars during final team cuts.

Cleveland Browns
On September 4, 2016, one day after his release from the Jaguars, Boddy-Calhoun was claimed off waivers by the Cleveland Browns. He made his regular season NFL debut against the Miami Dolphins in a 24-30 loss in Week 3. Boddy-Calhoun finished the game with six tackles and an interception return for a touchdown. In the 2016 season, he recorded 39 tackles and assisted on four. He had one sack, which came against the Washington Redskins in Week 4, three interceptions, and 11 passes defended.

In the 2017 season, he appeared in 13 games and recorded 39 total tackles and six passes defended. In the 2018 season, he appeared in all 16 games. He finished with 56 total tackles, two passes defended, and one forced fumble.

Houston Texans
On March 15, 2019, Boddy-Calhoun signed a one-year contract with the Houston Texans. The Texans waived him on August 31 during final roster cuts. He was re-signed on October 30. He saw his first game action as a Texan on November 3, recording two solo tackles, two pass deflections, a sack, and a forced fumble in a Week 9 victory over the Jacksonville Jaguars. He was released on November 13.

Indianapolis Colts
On December 18, 2019, Boddy-Calhoun was signed by the Indianapolis Colts. He played in three games in the 2019 season with the Texans and Colts. He had two sacks, 13 total tackles, and one forced fumble.

After becoming a free agent in March 2020, Boddy-Calhoun had a tryout with the Chicago Bears on August 20, 2020.

San Francisco 49ers
On December 9, 2020, Boddy-Calhoun was signed to the San Francisco 49ers practice squad. He was promoted to the active roster on December 12. He played in Week 14 against Washington in his only game time in the 2020 season. He was waived on December 14, and re-signed to the practice squad two days later. His practice squad contract with the team expired after the season on January 11, 2021. He was re-signed on March 17, 2021. Boddy-Calhoun was released on June 7, 2021.

Tennessee Titans
On July 28, 2021, Boddy-Calhoun signed with the Tennessee Titans. He was released on August 31, 2021, and re-signed to the practice squad.

NFL career statistics

References

External links

 
 Minnesota Golden Gophers bio

1993 births
Living people
African-American players of American football
American football cornerbacks
Cleveland Browns players
Houston Texans players
Jacksonville Jaguars players
Minnesota Golden Gophers football players
Players of American football from Wilmington, Delaware
San Francisco 49ers players
Tennessee Titans players
21st-century African-American sportspeople